The 20th Michigan Infantry Regiment was an infantry regiment that served in the Union Army during the American Civil War.

Service
The 20th Michigan Infantry was organized at Jackson, Michigan, between August 15 and August 19, 1862.

The regiment was mustered out of service on May 30, 1865.

The regiment is mentioned briefly in Chapter IX of MacKinlay Kantor's Pulitzer Prize-winning novel "Andersonville" (1955).

Total strength and casualties
The regiment lost 13 officers and 111 enlisted men killed in action or mortally wounded, and a further 3 officers and 175 enlisted men who died of disease, a total of 302 
fatalities.

Commanders
 Colonel Adolphus Wesley Williams

See also
List of Michigan Civil War Units
Michigan in the American Civil War

References

External links
 
The Civil War Archive
http://www.bookemon.com/read-book/58241 Addison Smith Boyce Civil War Journal

Units and formations of the Union Army from Michigan
1865 disestablishments in Michigan
1862 establishments in Michigan
Military units and formations established in 1862
Military units and formations disestablished in 1865